The Wailing Dervishes is a live album by American jazz flautist Herbie Mann recorded at the Village Theatre in New York City for the Atlantic label and released in 1967.

Reception

AllMusic awarded the album 4½ stars stating "The Wailing Dervishes chases after a fusion that is extremely rare even today - jazz and the Middle East. Believe it or not, it works -- and there are no commercial or ethnic compromises. ...Recorded live, this LP is definitely worth hunting for if you want to hear something really different.

Track listing
All compositions by Herbie Mann except as indicated
 "The Wailing Dervishes" - 8:30
 "Norwegian Wood" (John Lennon, Paul McCartney) - 10:38
 "Flute Bag" (Rufus Harley) - 3:55
 "In the Medina" - 9:30
 "Armenian Lullaby" (Chick Ganimian) - 7:35

Personnel 
Herbie Mann - flute
Hachig Thomas Kazarian - clarinet (tracks 2 & 5)
Rufus Harley - bagpipes (track 3)
Roy Ayers - vibraphone (tracks 1-4)
Esber Köprücü - zither (tracks 2 & 5)
Chick Ganimian - oud (tracks 1, 2, 4 & 5)
Oliver Collins - piano (track 3) 
James Glenn (track 3), Reggie Workman (tracks 1, 2 & 4) - bass
Steve Knight - electric bass (tracks 2 & 5)
Billy Abner (track 3), Bruno Carr (tracks 1, 2 & 4) - drums
Moulay "Ali" Hafid - dümbek (tracks 1, 2, 4 & 5)
Technical
Bruce Tergesen, Phil Iehle - engineer
Marvin Israel - design

References 

1967 live albums
Herbie Mann live albums
Albums produced by Nesuhi Ertegun
Atlantic Records live albums